Visa requirements for Tuvaluan citizens are administrative entry restrictions by the authorities of other states placed on citizens of Tuvalu. As of 20 December 2020, Tuvaluan citizens had visa-free or visa on arrival access to 127 countries and territories, ranking the Tuvaluan passport 45th in terms of travel freedom (tied with passport of Colombia) according to the Henley Passport Index.

Tuvalu signed a mutual visa waiver agreement with Schengen Area countries on 1 July 2016.


Visa requirements map

Visa requirements

Dependent, Disputed, or Restricted territories
Unrecognised or partially recognised countries

Dependent and autonomous territories

Non-visa restrictions

See also

Visa policy of Tuvalu
Tuvaluan passport

References and Notes
References

Notes

Tuvalu
Foreign relations of Tuvalu